The Raffaello MPLM, also known as MPLM-2, was one of three Multi-Purpose Logistics Modules which were operated by NASA to transfer supplies and equipment to and from the International Space Station. Raffaello was used for four of twelve MPLM flights to the space station, with Leonardo being used for the remainder. Raffaellos final flight was aboard  on the STS-135 mission, the last flight of the Space Shuttle. As of June 2015, it is now being stored at the Kennedy Space Center.

Construction
Like the other Multi-Purpose Logistics Modules, Raffaello was constructed by the Italian Space Agency, who chose to name it after the painter and architect Raffaello Sanzio. The module was constructed in the late 1990s, and delivered to NASA at the Kennedy Space Center in August 1999.

Flights

See also

Permanent Multipurpose Module
Leonardo MPLM

References

MPLM-2
Space hardware returned to Earth intact
Spacecraft launched in 2011
Raphael